Marquess of Navahermosa is an hereditary title in the Peerage of Spain, granted in 1683 by Charles II to Juan de Feloaga, knight of the Order of Santiago and member of the Council of Finance.

Marquesses of Navahermosa (1683)

Juan de Feloaga y Ponce de León, 1st Marquess of Navahermosa (1683-1702)
Francisco de Feloaga y Vargas, 2nd Marquess of Navahermosa (1702-1736)
José de Feloaga y Vargas, 3rd Marquess of Navahermosa (1736-?)
Juan Félix de Feloaga y Vargas, 4th Marquess of Navahermosa (?-1756)
Alejo de Feloaga y López de Zárate, 5th Marquess of Navahermosa (1756-?)
Félix de Feloaga y Gaytán, 6th Marquess of Navahermosa
Manuel de Salabert y Torres, 7th Marquess of Navahermosa (?-1834)
Narciso de Salabert y Pinedo, 8th Marquess of Navahermosa (1834-1885)
Casilda Remigia de Salabert y Arteaga, 9th Marchioness of Navahermosa (1885-1936)
Luis Fernández de Córdoba y Salabert, 10th Marquess of Navahermosa (1952-1956)
Victoria Eugenia Fernández de Córdoba y Fernández de Henestrosa, 11th Marchioness of Navahermosa (1958-1969)
Ana Luisa de Medina y Fernández de Córdoba, 12th Marchioness of Navahermosa (1969-2012)
Alexander Gonzalo de Hohenlohe-Langenburg y Schmidt-Polex, 13th Marquess of Navahermosa (2016-present)

See also
Duke of Ciudad Real

References

Marquesses of Spain
Lists of Spanish nobility
Noble titles created in 1683